KSNS (91.5 FM) is a radio station broadcasting a Contemporary Christian music format licensed to Medicine Lodge, Kansas.  The station is owned by Florida Public Radio, Inc.

References

External links
KSNS's official website

SNS